Treborth railway station was a railway station located on the Bangor and Carnarvon Railway, about half a mile south of the Britannia Bridge, Caernarfonshire, Wales, near the route of the modern day A55. Opened in June 1854 on the line connecting the Menai Bridge with Caernarfon with a single platform and brick waiting room, the station was briefly closed in October 1858 for about a month. In 1872 a second platform was built and the station remained active until March 1959 when it was closed. The line itself was closed finally in 1972 and lifted shortly afterwards.

The station building was converted to a private residence and is still standing, being listed on the Royal Commission on the Ancient and Historical Monuments of Wales database.

References

Further reading

External link
Aerial view of the station (free login needed to zoom)

Disused railway stations in Gwynedd
Railway stations in Great Britain opened in 1854
Railway stations in Great Britain closed in 1959
Former London and North Western Railway stations